Protoperigea is a genus of moths of the family Noctuidae.

Species
 Protoperigea anotha (Dyar, 1904)
 Protoperigea calientensis Mustelin, 2006
 Protoperigea parvulata Mustelin, 2006
 Protoperigea posticata (Harvey, 1875)
 Protoperigea subterminata Mustelin, 2006
 Protoperigea umbricata Mustelin, 2006

References
Natural History Museum Lepidoptera genus database
Protoperigea at funet

Hadeninae